Justice Sanjay Yadav (born 26 June 1959) is an Indian Judge. He is former Chief Justice of the Allahabad High Court. He has served as acting Chief Justice of the Allahabad High Court and Madhya Pradesh High Court. He has also served as Judge of the Allahabad High Court and Madhya Pradesh High Court.

Career 
Born on 6 June 1959. Enrolled as an Advocate on 25 August 1986. He practiced on Civil, Revenue and Constitutional side in the Madhya Pradesh High Court. He was appointed Deputy Advocate General of Madhya Pradesh. He was elevated as Additional Judge of Madhya Pradesh High Court on 2 March 2007 and Permanent on 15 January 2010. He was appointed Acting Chief Justice of Madhya Pradesh High Court with effect from 6 October 2019 to 2 November 2019 and from 30 September 2020 to 2 January 2021. He was transferred as Judge of Allahabad High Court on 8 January 2021. Appointed Acting Chief Justice of Allahabad High Court on 14 April 2021. He was appointed Chief Justice of Allahabad High Court on 10 June 2021 and took oath on 13 June 2021.
He retired on 25 June 2021.

References

Indian judges
1959 births
Living people